Ludvig Ludvigsen Daae (7 December 1834 – 17 March 1910) was a Norwegian historian and author. He was a professor at the University of Oslo for more than thirty years.

Biography
He was born in Aremark in Østfold and died in Kristiania (now Oslo), Norway. He was the son of Ludvig Daae (1806–35) and Sara Jessine Louise Brock (1811–91).  He was a student at Christiania Cathedral School  and graduated during  1852. He studied classical philology at the University of Kristiania (now University of Oslo) and graduated  in 1859.

Daae was assigned as a professor at the University of Kristiania  for more than thirty years  from 1876 to 1910. Daae was appointed professor of history at the University after Oluf Rygh had transferred to a professorship in archeology.   At the time of his retirement  his successor as a professor of history was Halvdan  Koht.

Daae published a large number of historic works  and was also a frequent contributor to newspapers. Among his other works in 1880 he wrote a biography of Ludvig Holberg and in 1899 he published an edition of Claus Pavels diaries from the period 1817 to 1822. He was decorated Commander, Second Class of the Order of St. Olav in 1905. He was a Knight of the Danish Order of Dannebrog and of the Swedish Order of the Polar Star.

Ludvig Daae wrote his personal memoirs in 1888-93 and in 1901. In 1944,  Wilhelm Munthe  published Professor Ludvig Daae : en minnebok (Oslo: Cammermeyer, 1944). In 2003, Daae's great-grandson, Nicolay Heinrich  Knudtzon, edited and published an edition of Daae's memoirs.

Selected works
Kong Christiern den Førstes norske Historie  (1879)
Gerhard Schøning  (1880) 
Om Humanisten og Satirikeren Johan Lauremberg  (1884)
 Ludvig Holberg  (1886)
Det gamle Christiania (1891)

References

Other sources
 Knudtzon, Nicolay Heinrich    (2003)  Professor, Dr. Ludvig Daaes erindringer og opptegnelser om sin samtid (Oslo: Novus Forlag)  
Dahl, Ottar  (1990) Norsk historieforskning i det 19. og 20. århundre(Oslo: Universitetsforlaget)

External links
Listing of works by Professor Ludvig Ludvigsen Daae

1834 births
1910 deaths
People from Aremark
People educated at Oslo Cathedral School
University of Oslo alumni
19th-century Norwegian historians
Norwegian educators
Academic staff of the University of Oslo
Knights of the Order of the Dannebrog
Knights of the Order of the Polar Star
 Recipients of the St. Olav's Medal
Members of the Royal Society of Sciences in Uppsala